Chavgun (also Romanized as Chāvgūn; also known as Chāhgūn and Shūrāgol) is a village in Qarah Quyun-e Shomali Rural District, in the Central District of Showt County, West Azerbaijan Province, Iran. At the 2006 census, its population was 77, in 21 families.

References 

Populated places in Showt County